Kasib is a rural locality (a selo) and the administrative center of Kasibskoye Rural Settlement, Solikamsky District, Perm Krai, Russia. The population was 549 as of 2010. There are 18 streets.

Geography 
Kasib is located 55 km northwest of Solikamsk (the district's administrative centre) by road. Sorvino is the nearest rural locality.

References 

Rural localities in Solikamsky District